Devils Dome is a  mountain summit located in the Valhalla Ranges of the Selkirk Mountains in southeast British Columbia, Canada. The peak is located in Devils Range, which is a subrange of the Valhallas. Devils Dome has a subpeak, unofficially called Dark Prince,  to the west. The names of the peaks of this small compact range have a devil-related theme: Black Prince Mountain, Lucifer Peak, Mount Mephistopheles, Mount Diablo, Satan Peak, Devils Spire, and Devils Couch. This peak's name was submitted by Pat Ridge of the Kootenay Mountaineering Club and officially adopted July 27, 1977, by the Geographical Names Board of Canada. The first ascent of the peak was made in 1973 by Howie Ridge, Peter Wood, and G. Stein via the southeast ridge.

Climate
Based on the Köppen climate classification, Devils Dome has a subarctic climate with cold, snowy winters, and mild summers. Winter temperatures can drop below −20 °C with wind chill factors below −30 °C. Precipitation runoff from the mountain drains into Gwillim Creek and Evans Creek, both tributaries of the Slocan River.

Climbing Routes
Established climbing routes on Devils Dome:

 Southeast Ridge -  First Ascent 1973
 South Face Couloir - class 5.6 FA 1977

Gallery

See also
Geography of British Columbia

References

External links

 Weather forecast: Devils Dome  

Two-thousanders of British Columbia
Selkirk Mountains
Kootenay Land District